Pavel Nikolaevich Prokudin (born 17 August 1966) is a former Prime Minister of Transnistria.

See also
Government of Transnistria

Notes

References

1966 births
Living people
People from Novosibirsk Oblast
Prime Ministers of Transnistria
Transnistrian politicians